Sansi is a Rajputana inherited clan in India, originally located in the Rajasthan area of northwestern India, but expelled in the 13th century by Muslim invaders and now spread to states of Rajasthan as well as scattered throughout India and Sindh, Pakistan. They claim Rajput descent. There were two distinct offshoots of the tribe: the first was a vagrant community connected to the Jat tribes of Central Punjab; the second was an agricultural Jat clan found in Sahiwal, Amritsar and Gujranwala. They are often confused with other ethnic groups called Sansi, as Sansi is a widespread name in South Asia.

Language
Their language is Sansiboli, or Bhilki too that is a highly endangered Indo-Aryan language of the Central group, total speakers in India 60,000 (2002) and Pakistan 20,000. Their traditional occupations vary, from trading to farming.

History
During British rule in India they were placed under the Criminal Tribes Act 1871, hence stigmatized for a long time, after independence, however, they were denotified in 1952.
As the Sansiya, they were recorded in Uttar Pradesh in the 2011 Census of India. There they were a Scheduled Caste, with a population of 5689.

Further reading

References

Indian castes
Social groups of Rajasthan
Social groups of Punjab, India
Social groups of Haryana
Ethnic groups in India
Scheduled Castes of Haryana
Punjabi tribes
Denotified tribes of India
Scheduled Castes of Uttar Pradesh